The term's minority reign and royal minority refer to the period of a sovereign's rule when he or she is legally a minor. Minority reigns are of their nature times when politicians and advisors can be especially competitive. Some scholars claim that, in Britain, primogeniture, the growth of conciliar government, and the emergence of the Parliament as a representative and administrative force all occurred within the context of the minority reigns.

Minority reigns also characterized a period in the Roman Empire from 367 to 455, the years that preceded the reign of Valentinian III, who also became emperor at the age of six. The succession of child-turned-adult emperors led to the so-called infantilization of the imperial office, which had taken hold during the long reign of Honorius, Valentinian's predecessor. Here, the imperial office operated within a severely curtailed system compared to its authority a century prior.

Authority 
Commonly, a regent is appointed if a sovereign is a minor. There are cases when no regent is appointed, but these did not mean that the monarch held authority. For example, during the minority reign of Theodosius II, power was wielded by Anthemius before his sister Pulcheria was appointed the regent. In many instances, the advent of a royal minority led to fierce competition for any regency office, and in England only one actual regent was ever appointed: In October 1216 William Marshal, 1st Earl of Pembroke became regent for the nine-year-old Henry III on the death of King John.  Subsequent royal minorities before 1811 were dealt with by the appointment of officers who held the less provocative title "Lords Justices of the Realm", "Lord Protector" or "Protector and Defender" (after 1422), and sometimes "Guardian of the Realm".  In all instances they were intended to be assisted by a collective council or body of officials, although the brief Protectorate of Richard, duke of Gloucester from April to June 1483 did not allow for the naming of an official council.

Examples 
Sovereigns who have ruled as minors include:
 Valentinian III, Western Roman Emperor
 Louis the Child of East Francia
 Otto III, Holy Roman Emperor
 Henry IV of Germany
 Frederick II of the Holy Roman Empire
 Pedro II of Brazil
 Simeon II of Bulgaria
 Philip I of France
 Louis IX of France
 John I of France
 Charles VI of France
 Charles VIII of France
 Francis II of France
 Charles IX of France
 Louis XIII of France
 Louis XIV of France
 Louis XV of France
 Henry III of England
 Edward III of England
 Richard II of England
 Henry VI of England
 Edward V of England
 Edward VI of England
 Ladislaus III of Hungary
 Mary of Hungary
 Marie-Adélaïde, Grand Duchess of Luxembourg
 Wilhelmina of the Netherlands
 Sancho II of Portugal
 Afonso V of Portugal
 Sebastian of Portugal
 Afonso VI of Portugal
 Maria II of Portugal
 Pedro V of Portugal
 Michael of Romania
 Ivan IV of Russia
 Peter I the Great of Russia
 Malcolm IV of Scotland
 Alexander III of Scotland
 David II of Scotland
 James I of Scotland
 James II of Scotland
 James III of Scotland
 James IV of Scotland
 James V of Scotland
 Mary, Queen of Scots
 James VI of Scotland
 Alfonso V of León
 Bermudo III of León
 Alfonso VIII of Castile
 Henry I of Castile
 Ferdinand IV of Castile
 Alfonso XI of Castile
 Henry III of Castile
 John II of Castile
 García Sánchez I of Pamplona
 Theobald II of Navarre
 Joan I of Navarre
 Francis Phoebus of Navarre
 Catherine of Navarre
 Petronilla of Aragon
 Alfonso II of Aragon
 James I of Aragon
 Charles II of Spain
 Isabella II of Spain
 Alfonso XIII of Spain
 Peter II of Yugoslavia
 Liu Hong of Western Han (China)
 Emperor Zhao of Western Han (China)
 Emperor Ping of Western Han (China)
 Emperor He of Eastern Han (China)
 Emperor Shang of Eastern Han (China)
 Emperor An of Eastern Han (China)
 Emperor Shun of Eastern Han (China)
 Emperor Chong of Eastern Han (China)
 Emperor Zhi of Eastern Han (China)
 Emperor Huan of Eastern Han (China)
 Emperor Ling of Eastern Han (China)
 Liu Bian of Eastern Han (China)
 Emperor Xian of Eastern Han (China)
 Cao Fang of Cao Wei (China)
 Cao Mao of Cao Wei (China)
 Emperor Yuan of Cao Wei (China)
 Sun Liang of Eastern Wu (China)
 Emperor Min of Western Jin (China)
 Emperor Cheng of Eastern Jin (China)
 Emperor Mu of Eastern Jin (China)
 Emperor Xiaowu of Eastern Jin (China)
 Emperor An of Eastern Jin (China)
 Duke Ai of Former Liang (China)
 Prince Chong of Former Liang (China)
 Shi Shi of Later Zhao (China)
 Emperor You of Former Yan (China)
 Emperor Wencheng of Northern Wei (China)
 Emperor Xianwen of Northern Wei (China)
 Emperor Xiaowen of Northern Wei (China)
 Emperor Xiaoming of Northern Wei (China)
 Yuan Zhao of Northern Wei (China)
 Emperor Xiaojing of Eastern Wei (China)
 Gao Yin of Northern Qi (China)
 Gao Wei of Northern Qi (China)
 Gao Heng of Northern Qi (China)
 Emperor Jing of Northern Zhou (China)
 Liu Yu of Liu Song (China)
 Emperor Shun of Liu Song (China)
 Xiao Zhaowen of Southern Qi (China)
 Emperor He of Southern Qi (China)
 Emperor Jing of Liang (China)
 Chen Bozong of Chen (China)
 Yang You of Sui (China)
 Yang Tong of Sui (China)
 Emperor Shang of Tang (China)
 Emperor Jingzong of Tang (China)
 Emperor Xizong of Tang (China)
 Emperor Ai of Tang (China)
 Emperor Gong of Later Zhou (China)
 Emperor Xuan of Yang Wu (China)
 King Chengzong of Wuyue (China)
 Emperor Shengzong of Liao (China)
 Emperor Renzong of Northern Song (China)
 Emperor Zhezong of Northern Song (China)
 Emperor Gong of Southern Song (China)
 Emperor Duanzong of Southern Song (China)
 Zhao Bing of Southern Song (China)
 Emperor Yizong of Western Xia (China)
 Emperor Huizong of Western Xia (China)
 Emperor Chongzong of Western Xia (China)
 Tianshun Emperor of Yuan (China)
 Emperor Ningzong of Yuan (China)
 Emperor Yingzong of Ming (China)
 Zhengde Emperor of Ming (China)
 Jiajing Emperor of Ming (China)
 Wanli Emperor of Ming (China)
 Tianqi Emperor of Ming (China)
 Shunzhi Emperor of Qing (China)
 Kangxi Emperor of Qing (China)
 Tongzhi Emperor of Qing (China)
 Guangxu Emperor of Qing (China)
 Xuantong Emperor of Qing (China)

Footnotes

Ageism
 
Juvenile law
Reigns